Flight 203 may refer to:

Galaxy Airlines Flight 203, crashed on 21 January 1985
Avianca Flight 203, exploded on 27 November 1989
Red Air Flight 203, excursed on 21 June 2022

0203